"Tera Woh Pyar" may refer to:

 Tera Woh Pyar, CokeStudio9 song by Asim Azhar and Momina Mustehsan
 Tera Woh Pyar, a TV programme on Hum Sitaray